Margaretha Louise Dryburgh (née Lindahl; born 20 October 1974) is a Swedish curler, world champion and Olympic medalist. She received five international medals as an alternate in Elisabet Gustafson's team, including a bronze medal at the 1998 Winter Olympics in Nagano. She skipped her own team to a silver medal at the 1999 European Curling Championships.

Lindahl met her husband, James Dryburgh, while at the Olympics 1998. He was the alternate for the Scottish team.

References

External links
 

1974 births
Living people
Swedish female curlers
World curling champions
Olympic curlers of Sweden
Curlers at the 1998 Winter Olympics
Olympic bronze medalists for Sweden
Olympic medalists in curling
Medalists at the 1998 Winter Olympics
European curling champions